The Underling is an EP of Cleric, released independently in 2003. It was recorded for $200 at Bowling Otter Recordings by Matt Buckley. Mixing was never completed because the hard drive containing the album failed, leaving the album unfinished. In celebration of the three year anniversary of their 2010 debut album, the band remastered The Underling in 2013 and uploaded the music to Bandcamp.

Track listing

Personnel
Adapted from The Underling liner notes.

Cleric
 Matt Hollenberg – electric guitar
 Larry Kwartowitz – drums
 Nick Shellenberger – vocals, cover art
 Chris Weindel – bass guitar

Production and additional personnel
 Matt Buckley – production
 Cleric – production, recording

Release history

References

External links 
 The Underling at Discogs (list of releases)
 The Underling at Bandcamp

2003 EPs
Cleric (band) albums